Mark H. Holmes is an American applied mathematician and Professor of Mathematics at Rensselaer Polytechnic Institute, where he served as Chair of the Department of Mathematical Sciences, and was the founding Director of the Center for Modeling, Optimization and Computational Analysis (MOCA).

Personal life
Mark H. Holmes was born in Onawa, Iowa on November 7, 1950. He attended Colorado State University, where he earned his B.S. in 1973, and the University of California, Los Angeles, where he received his PhD in mathematics in 1978. His PhD thesis advisor was Julian Cole.

Research
He is known for his contributions in mathematical biology, including mechanoreception (hearing and touch), neurobiology (Parkinson's Disease and the sleep-wake cycle), and tissue mechanics (articular cartilage).  His research articles are listed on his Google Scholar page.

Educational initiatives
He has been instrumental in numerous educational initiatives.  This has included starting the Rensselaer laptop program (in 1995), co-directing Project Links for developing web-based learning modules (1995–2003), creating the Gateway Exam (1999–2007), organizing the Rensselaer Calculus Video Project (2000–2008), and heading the Rensselaer GAANN program (2009–2016) for recruiting, and retaining, under-represented groups in mathematics.  Holmes has written several textbooks based on some of the applied math courses offered at Rensselaer.  These are held in 950 libraries worldwide.

Honors and awards
Guggenheim Fellow
Y.C. Fung Young Investigator Award
Premier Award for Excellence in Engineering Education Courseware
American Society of Mechanical Engineers (ASME) Curriculum Innovation Award for 2001
Rensselaer Trustee's Outstanding Teacher Award for 2007

Books
Introduction to Differential Equations, XanEdu Publishing, 2020.
Introduction to Differential Equations, XanEdu Publishing, 2020.
Introduction to the Foundations of Applied Mathematics (2nd Ed), Springer International Publishing, 2019.
Introduction to the Foundations of Applied Mathematics (2nd Ed), Springer International Publishing, 2019.
Introduction to Scientific Computing and Data Analysis, Springer International Publishing, 2016.
Introduction to Scientific Computing and Data Analysis, Springer International Publishing, 2016.
Introduction to Perturbation Methods (2nd Ed), Springer-Verlag New York, 2013.
Introduction to Perturbation Methods (2nd Ed), Springer-Verlag New York, 2013.
Introduction to Numerical Methods in Differential Equations, Springer-Verlag New York, 2007.
Introduction to Numerical Methods in Differential Equations, Springer-Verlag New York, 2007.

References

External links 
Holmes' home page at Rensselaer Polytechnic Institute
Mark Holmes at the Mathematics Genealogy Project

1950 births
Living people
20th-century American mathematicians
Applied mathematicians
Rensselaer Polytechnic Institute faculty
Colorado State University alumni
University of California, Los Angeles alumni
21st-century American mathematicians